The Jordan Fed Cup team represents Jordan in Fed Cup tennis competition and are governed by the Jordan Tennis Federation. They have not competed since 2007.

History
Jordan competed in its first Fed Cup in 2000.  Their best result was 7th in Asia/Oceania Group II final in 2000.

See also
Fed Cup
Jordan Davis Cup team

External links

Billie Jean King Cup teams
Fed Cup
Fed Cup